John Harvey Weis (December 5, 1911 – October 17, 1992) was a member of the Ohio House of Representatives.

References

Republican Party members of the Ohio House of Representatives
1911 births
1992 deaths
20th-century American politicians